Member of the Royal College of Psychiatrists (MRCPsych) is a postnominal qualification awarded to physicians who have completed the prescribed training requirements and membership examinations mandated by the Royal College of Psychiatrists. MRCPsych is awarded after the completion of the required amount of clinical practice (often during core psychiatry training) and successful completion of examinations. A further three years within psychiatry and a certificate of completion of specialist training are required to register as a psychiatrist on the General Medical Council specialist register.  The examination has undergone a radical change in the past few years, notably in terms of focus and structure.

Composition 
This meant that there were now three written exams and a Clinical Assessment of Skills & Competencies (CASC). In order to obtain membership candidates currently need to complete 30 months post foundation/internship experience in Psychiatry and a pass in all components of the MRCPsych Examinations.  The current examination consists of 3 parts, with 2 written papers and a clinical exam (CASC). Paper A focuses on Neuroscience, Pharmacology, Psychology and theory, while Paper B focuses on Current Clinical Practice & Evidence within General Adult and the various subspecialties of Psychiatry, Epidemiology, Statistics, Critical Appraisal and Psychotherapy.

History
The qualification was first introduced in 1972 a year after the founding of the Royal College of Psychiatrists. In recent years extensive modernisation has taken place in line with changes occurring in medical training in the UK. Major changes included the replacement of the classical long case method of assessment (where a single case is presented to the candidate, a history is taken and the case is presented to the examiners) with the objective structured clinical exam (OSCE) in 2003, and the subsequent replacement of the OSCE with the CASC exam in 2008.  A major factor for these changes has been the perceived reliability of the assessments. The long case assessments were criticised for their inter-test reliability with a study showing the reproducibility coefficient was as low as 0.24. However, some psychiatrists were disappointed that loss of the long case method of assessment may be a detriment to future candidates ability to take an effective clinical history.

References

Further reading
S Dosani,(2006), pg. 104, Making it in British Medicine: Essential Guidance for International Doctors

External links

Educational institutions established in 1841
Medical credentials
Medical education in the United Kingdom
Psychiatry in the United Kingdom

de:Royal College of Psychiatrists
zh:英國皇家精神科醫學院